Oman Cricket Academy Ground, also known as the Al Amerat Cricket Stadium, is a cricket ground in Muscat, Oman. The ground is owned by the Oman Cricket Board. In January 2021, the International Cricket Council (ICC) gave accreditation for the Ministry Turf 1 at the stadium to host Test cricket.

History
In July 2008, Oman Cricket announced plans to construct an international-standard facility at Al Amarat, about 15 kilometres south-east of the centre of the city of Muscat. The cost of the project was initially estimated at 2 million Omani rials (US$5.2 million), with the land donated by the Ministry of Sports Affairs and the rest of the funding to be raised through corporate sponsorship. The venue, known as the Al Amerat Cricket Stadium, was inaugurated in October 2012, by Ashraful Haque, the chief executive of the Asian Cricket Council. It held its first match – a club game – two months later. Floodlights were installed at the venue in 2015, and there are plans for an indoor academy to be built, to complement the existing academy at the Sultan Qaboos Sports Complex. Oman Cricket Board later announced the construction of pavilions and an indoor state of the art training facility that also houses the HQ for Oman Cricket Board.

The venue hosted the 2019 ACC Western Region T20, followed by the Oman Quadrangular Series in February 2019. Matches played in both events had Twenty20 International status.

On 21 January 2019, in a match between the Maldives and Bahrain, the Maldivian bowler Ibrahim Hassan took the first ever Twenty20 International (T20I) five-wicket haul on this ground.

On 23 January 2019, in a match between Kuwait and Bahrain, Kuwait's Ravija Sandaruwan scored the first ever Twenty20 International (T20I) century on this ground.

In October 2019, a Pentangular T20 Series between ICC associate sides with ODI status, Oman, Ireland, Nepal and the Netherlands in addition to Hong Kong (not ODI status) was held at the venue. Home side Oman won all 4 of their matches to win the series including beating Nepal in the final game having dismissed them for a record low score at the stadium of 64

In November 2019, first round of Cricket World Cup Challenge League B was scheduled to take place in Hong Kong. However, citing the instability in Hong Kong, all the matches were moved to this venue.

In February 2020, it hosted 2020 ACC Western Region T20.
The stadium hosted the 2021 ICC Men's T20 World Cup along with UAE due to rising cases in India. Following the qualification to host the 2021 ICC Men's T20 World Cup, the Al Amerat Turf 1 underwent major changes with the addition of new floodlights and pavilions. It is expected to have a seating capacity of 4000, including VIP and VVIP seating along with dedicated commentary boxes. The scoreboard was also upgraded to a digital scoreboard. Six matches were played at the stadium during the first-round stage of the tournament, including all three of Oman's matches.

International record

Ministry Turf 1

One-Day International centuries
The following table summarizes the centuries scored in ODIs at this venue.

One-Day International five-wicket hauls
The following table summarizes the five-wicket hauls taken in ODIs at this venue.

Twenty20 International centuries
Two T20I centuries have been scored at the venue.

Twenty20 International five-wicket hauls
The following table summarizes the five-wicket hauls taken in T20Is at this venue.

Women's Twenty20 International centuries
Two WT20I centuries has been scored at the venue.

Women's Twenty20 International five-wicket hauls
The following table summarizes the five-wicket hauls taken in WT20Is at this venue.

Ministry Turf 2

Twenty20 International centuries
Three T20I centuries have been scored at the venue.

Twenty20 International five-wicket hauls
One five-wicket haul has been taken in T20Is at this venue.

Women's Twenty20 International centuries
Two WT20I centuries have been scored at the venue.

Women's Twenty20 International five-wicket hauls
One five-wicket haul has been taken in WT20Is at this venue.

References

2012 establishments in Oman
Sports venues completed in 2012
Cricket grounds in Oman
Buildings and structures in Muscat, Oman
Sports venues in Muscat, Oman